HMS Gabbard was a  of the Royal Navy (RN). She was named in honour of the Battle of the Gabbard, which occurred in 1653, and which resulted in an English victory over the Dutch Fleet. Gabbard was built by Swan Hunter & Wigham Richardson Limited on the Tyne. She was laid down on 2 February 1944, launched on 16 March 1945 and completed on 10 December 1946.

Royal Navy service
Upon commissioning, Gabbard joined the 5th Destroyer Flotilla, part of the Home Fleet based in the UK. In 1947, Gabbard, while on a visit to Malmö, Sweden, narrowly avoided collision with the ferry Malmohus out of Aarhus, Denmark. The harbour at Malmö is in the form of a capital 'E' the central segment being a stone jetty. The destroyer , entered the harbour first and tied up with the stone jetty on her port bow. She was followed by Gabbard.  In order to depart, Gabbard swung round on her bow cable and started to steam ahead.  At the same time the ferry entered the harbour. To avoid a collision, Gabbard went astern at speed. She then went ahead but was still going astern when she hit a ship on the stocks. The depth charge racks which protruded over the stern were forced up over the deck.  She then was travelling forward and struck the end of the stone jetty on her starboard side.  She suffered serious damage from the 'break' to the stern.

The cruise deployed to South Africa and the West Indies, performing a number of fly-the-flag visits to a variety of ports, and performing naval exercises and other duties. In 1949, Gabbard, escorting Vengeance once more, deployed to the cold climate of the Arctic for experiments in that region.

In 1953, Gabbard decommissioned, and was subsequently placed in Reserve.

Sale to Pakistan

On 29 February 1956 the Admiralty announced that Gabbard was being sold to the Pakistan Navy. She was refitted and modernized with funds made available by the United States Mutual Defence Assistance Programme and commissioned as PNS Badr (D-161). The refit was undertaken by Palmers Hebburn, Yarrow.  She was handed over to the Pakistan Navy on 24 January 1957 and sailed from Portsmouth to Karachi on 17 February 1957. During the war of 1965 Badr participated in Operation Dwarka

Notes

Publications
 
 

 

Battle-class destroyers of the Royal Navy
Ships built by Swan Hunter
Ships built on the River Tyne
1945 ships
Cold War destroyers of the United Kingdom
Battle-class destroyers of the Pakistan Navy